"You're Not Alone" is a song released as the Australian official Olympic Team Song in 1988. It was credited to Australian Olympians which was made up of a selection of Australian rock and pop singers, television and radio announcers and olympic athletes. Profits from the sale of the record went towards the Australian Olympic Federation. The song peaked at number 18 in Australia in May 1988.

At the ARIA Music Awards of 1989, the song was nominated for 'Highest Selling Single', losing to "I Should Be So Lucky" by Kylie Minogue.

Artists involved
Angry Anderson,
Julie Anthony,
Mary Azzopardi,
Basia Bonkowski,
Ian Belton,
Daryl Braithwaite,
Neil Brooks,
Kate Ceberano,
Jonathan Coleman,
Tommy Emmanuel,
Jon English,
The Fabulous Singlettes,
Paul Field,
Renée Geyer,
Michael Horrocks,
Grace Knight,
Brian Mannix,
Norman May,
Keren Minshull,
Sam McNally,
Mark Meyer,
Mark Moffatt,
Rick Price,
Ian Rogerson,
Vince Sorrenti,
Richard Wilkins and
Ross Wilson

Track listing
CD Single (CBS 651556-7)
 "You're Not Alone" - 5:15
 "You're Not Alone" (Instrumental) - 5:15

Charts

References

1988 songs
1988 singles
Olympic songs
All-star recordings